Menonvillea is a genus of flowering plants belonging to the family Brassicaceae.

It is native to Chile and western Argentina.

The genus name of Menonvillea is in honour of Nicolas-Joseph Thiéry de Menonville (1739–1780), a French botanist who volunteered to be sent to Mexico in 1776 to steal the cochineal insect valued for its scarlet dye. 
It was first described and published in Mém. Mus. Hist. Nat. Vol.7 on page 236 in 1821.

Known species
According to Kew:

Menonvillea chilensis 
Menonvillea cicatricosa 
Menonvillea comberi 
Menonvillea constitutionis 
Menonvillea cuneata 
Menonvillea famatinensis 
Menonvillea filifolia 
Menonvillea flexuosa 
Menonvillea frigida 
Menonvillea linearis 
Menonvillea littoralis 
Menonvillea macrocarpa 
Menonvillea marticorenae 
Menonvillea minima 
Menonvillea nordenskjoeldii 
Menonvillea orbiculata 
Menonvillea patagonica 
Menonvillea pinnatifida 
Menonvillea purpurea 
Menonvillea rigida 
Menonvillea scapigera 
Menonvillea spathulata 
Menonvillea virens 
Menonvillea zuloagaensis

References

Brassicaceae
Brassicaceae genera
Plants described in 1821
Flora of Chile
Flora of Argentina